The Bhagalia are a clan of the Bhil ethnic community and are found in the state of Rajasthan, India.

It is also the family name of:

Salim Bhagalia, South African cricketer

References

Scheduled Tribes of Rajasthan
Bhil clans